Markov Processes International, Inc.  (MPI) Is a provider of investment research, analytics and technology, used by organizations throughout the financial services industry, including: alternative research groups, hedge funds, hedge fund of funds, family offices, institutional investors, consultants, private banks, asset managers, investment advisors and private wealth professionals. 

MPI's quantitative platform, Stylus Pro, analyzes hedge funds, mutual funds, portfolios and other investment products, in addition to providing asset allocation and portfolio optimization technology tools.

History 
Michael Markov and Mik Kvitchko developed the first returns-based style analysis (RBSA) software application based on Nobel Laureate William F. Sharpe's methodology. RBSA can be used to identify combinations of passive investments to closely replicate the performance of funds.

MPI's flagship software product, Stylus, is for research and reporting.

MPI developed the first visual manager search application, Enterprise Prospector, which can be used to create custom statistics, performance measures, peer groups and investment product rating systems. Four years later, MPI introduced the first Dynamic Style Analysis (DSA) model, an advanced methodology for returns-based analysis of hedge funds. DSA featured a proprietary cross validation technique, Predicted R-Squared. In 2008, MPI released its patent-pending Calibrated Frontiers methodology, an innovative and robust approach to portfolio resampling. Two years later, MPI released the new Stylus Web with “plan level” reporting functionality.

References 

 Sommer, Jeff. "", New York Times, 2010-06-18. Retrieved September 1, 2010.
 Janowski, Davis. "", InvestmentNews, 2010-05-03. Retrieved September 1, 2010.
 Miller, Jonathan. "", Citywire, 2010-03-05. Retrieved September 1, 2010.
 Sullivan, Tom. "Hedge or Mutual Fund?", Dow Jones, 2010-01-04. Retrieved February 8, 2010.
 Checkler, Joseph. "Galleon Fund's Big July 2006 Gain Coincided With ATI Buyout", Dow Jones, 2009-11-17. Retrieved February 8, 2010.
 Markov, Michael. "Using Daily Returns To Identify Bond Fund Risks", InvestmentNews, 2009-09-23. Retrieved February 8, 2010.
 Markov, Michael. "Quantitative Due Diligence of Fixed Income Portfolios: A case study of the Oppenheimer Core Bond Fund", 2009-06. Retrieved February 8, 2010.
 Markov, Michael. "The Similarities Between Pearl Harbor and Bernie Madoff", Pensions & Investments, 2009-04-06. Retrieved June 9, 2009.
 Li, Daniel; Markov, Michael; Wermers, Russ. "Monitoring Daily Hedge Fund Performance When Only Monthly Data is Available", 2009-04-01. Retrieved June 9, 2009.
 Walker, David. "Madoff Claims ‘Too Good to be True’", Financial News, 2009-01-12. Retrieved June 9, 2009.
 Markov, Michael. "Madoff: A Tale of Two Funds", 2008-12. Retrieved January 7, 2008.
 "Con of the century", The Economist, 2008-12-18. Retrieved January 7, 2008.
 Konigsberg, Eric. "In Fraud Case, Middlemen in Spotlight", The New York Times, 2008-12-16. Retrieved January 7, 2008.
 Bischoff, Kirsten. "Opalesque Exclusive", Opalesque, 2008-10-21. Retrieved January 7, 2008.   
 Wright, Christopher. "Cleaning Closets", CFA Magazine, 2008-09. Retrieved October 3, 2008.
 Markov, Michael. "The Law of Large Numbers: An Analysis of the Renaissance Fund", 2008-07. Retrieved October 15, 2008.
 Grene, Sophia. "Lifting the Lid on Hedge Fund Risks", Financial Times, 2007-09-24. Retrieved  September 24, 2007.
 Bühlmann, Véronique. "Big DSA is Watching You!", Banque & Finance, 2007-07. Retrieved September 15, 2008.
 Kurdas, Chidem. "When Long Means Loss", HedgeWorld, 2006-07-18. Retrieved September 15, 2008.
 Kurdas, Chidem. "Outlook 2006: A Challenging Comparison", HedgeWorld, 2006-01-25. Retrieved September 15, 2008.
 Markov, Michael. "It's in the Numbers - How Proper Analysis of Returns can be a Crystal Ball", 2006 Retrieved October 15, 2008.
 Markov, Michael. "Bill Miller vs. Manu Daftary - 2005 Duel Results", 2006 Retrieved October 15, 2008.
 Cantrell, Amanda. "Hedge Funds Headed for a Fall?", CNNMoney.com, 2005-11-15. Retrieved September 15, 2008.  
 Hansard, Sara.  "Bayou Collapse Sends a Warning Signal", Investment News, 2005-09-19. Retrieved September 15, 2008 from ABI/INFORM Global database. (Document ID: 1340854541). 
 "Finance And Economics: In the Garden of Good and Evil; Hedge Funds", The Economist, 2005-09. Retrieved September 9, 2008.
 Markov, Michael. "Why Would One Invest in an Outlier? - A Bayou Analysis", 2005 Retrieved October 15, 2008.
 Markov, Michael. "Seeing Through Walls - Bringing Greater Transparency to Hedge and Mutual Fund Analysis", 2005 Retrieved October 15, 2008.

Software companies based in New Jersey
Software companies of the United States